Miss USA 2020 was the 69th Miss USA pageant. It was held at the Exhibition Centre and the Soundstage at Graceland in Memphis, Tennessee, on November 9, 2020. Akbar Gbaja-Biamila and Allie LaForce served as hosts, while Cheslie Kryst and Christian Murphy served as backstage commentators, and Haley Reinhart performed. Cheslie Kryst of North Carolina crowned Asya Branch of Mississippi as her successor at the end of the event. Branch is the second consecutive African American to win the title, and the fourth one in five years. This is Mississippi's first win at the Miss USA pageant. Branch represented the United States at the Miss Universe 2020 pageant and placed in the Top 21.

Originally scheduled to be held in spring 2020 and was initially to air on Fox, the competition was postponed indefinitely due to the COVID-19 pandemic. On August 31, the Miss Universe Organization announced that the competition would be held on November 9 of the same year.

FYI served as the new broadcaster of the pageant, replacing Fox, which had broadcast the pageant since 2016. The show was also rebroadcast on November 18, 2020 on YouTube. The competition marked the first year that a new crown made by jeweler Mouawad is used at Miss USA, effectively retiring the Mikimoto Crown.

For a third consecutive year, the competition was held concurrently alongside the Miss Teen USA competition. This was the last Miss USA to be organized by Miss Universe Organization before being split into its separate organization beginning in Miss USA 2021.

Background

Location

On August 30, 2020, Graceland announced on their schedule that the competition would be held on November 9 on their premises in Memphis, Tennessee. The MUO later confirmed that the competition would be hosted at Graceland the following day. This was the first time since Miss USA 1983 that the state of Tennessee would be hosting the pageant.

Hosts and performer
On October 22, it was announced that the competition would be hosted by Akbar Gbaja-Biamila and Allie LaForce, while Cheslie Kryst and Christian Murphy would serve as backstage correspondents. Gbaja-Biamila is a commentator on American Ninja Warrior and former professional football player, while LaForce formerly was crowned Miss Teen USA 2005, and has worked as a sports reporter for Fox and Turner Sports.

On the same day, American Idol alum Haley Reinhart was announced as the musical guest.

Selection of contestants
Delegates from 50 states and the District of Columbia were selected in state pageants which began in September 2019 and concluded in February 2020. The first state pageant was Texas, held on September 1, 2019, while the final pageant was Kentucky, held on February 1, 2020. Nine of these delegates were former Miss Teen USA state winners, six of them were former Miss America state winners, one delegate was a former Miss America's Outstanding Teen state winner, and one was former Miss Earth United States winner who competed at Miss Earth 2017.

Rachel Slawson, Miss Utah USA 2020, became the first openly LGBT woman to compete in Miss USA; Slawson identifies herself as queer. One state titleholder was appointed as a replacement after the original titleholder was unable to compete. Katie Bozner, the original Miss Wyoming USA 2020, resigned three weeks before Miss USA 2020 due to her academic obligations in optometry school. She was replaced by Lexi Revelli, who was the first runner-up of the Miss Wyoming USA 2020 pageant.

COVID-19 restrictions
The pageant was heavily impacted by the COVID-19 pandemic. Restrictions implemented included an audience of only 300 spectators for both the preliminary and final competitions, and daily temperature checks, COVID-19 testing and social distancing measures for contestants and staff members. If a delegate tests positive from COVID-19, she would automatically withdraw from the competition, resulted all of the delegates were tested negative prior to arrive in Memphis. Other in-person events such as pre-pageant activities had been cancelled, including press briefings from pageant commentators.

Results

§ Voted into Top 16 by viewers.

Special award

Pageant

Preliminary round
Prior to the final competition, the delegates competed the preliminary competition, which the judges and a presentation show where they competed in swim wear and evening gown. It was held on November 6 at Graceland Exhibition Center and the Soundstage in Memphis hosted by Christian Murphy and Cheslie Kryst.

Finals
For the first time since Miss USA 2012, the number of finalists increased to 16, up from 15 in previous years. The sixteenth finalist was determined through an online vote from the viewing public. During the final competition, the top sixteen competed in swimsuit, and the top ten in evening gown. The top five format returned for the first time since Miss USA 2015, where the five finalists competed in two question rounds. The winner and her runners-up were determined by a panel of judges.

Judges
Carolyn Aronson – businesswoman and hairstylist
Lynnette Cole – Miss USA 2000 from Tennessee
Abby Hornacek – Fox Nation journalist and media personality
Gloria Mayfield Banks – motivational speaker, author, and entrepreneur 
Kimberly Pressler – Miss USA 1999 from New York
Susan Yara – businesswoman and social media personality

Contestants 
All 51 state titleholders have been crowned.

Notes

References

External links

 Miss USA official website

2020
November 2020 events in the United States
2020 beauty pageants
2020 in Tennessee
Beauty pageants in the United States
Events postponed due to the COVID-19 pandemic
Impact of the COVID-19 pandemic on television